Paksiw is a Filipino style of cooking, whose name  means "to cook and simmer in vinegar". Common dishes bearing the term, however, can vary substantially depending on what is being cooked.

Pinangat na isda may sometimes also be referred to as paksiw, though it is a different but related dish that uses sour fruits like calamansi, kamias (bilimbi) or sampalok (tamarind) to sour the broth rather than vinegar.

Types
Paksiw refers to a wide range of very different dishes that are cooked in a vinegar broth. They include the following:

Ginataang paksiw na isda

A common variant of ginataang isda (fish in coconut milk) that adds vinegar to sour the broth. This variant combines the ginataan and paksiw methods of cooking in Filipino cuisine.

Inun-unan
Inun-unan or inun-onan is a notable Visayan version of the fish paksiw dish spiced primarily with ginger, as well as onions, shallots, pepper, salt, and sometimes siling haba chilis. Unlike northern paksiw na isda, it does not include vegetables and very little or no water is added to the broth. It is sometimes anglicized as "boiled pickled fish". The name comes from the Visayan verb un-un or un-on, meaning to "stew with vinegar, salt, and spices."

Paksiw na baboy
Paksiw na baboy, which is pork, usually hock or shank (paksiw na pata for pig's trotters), cooked in ingredients similar to those in adobo but with the addition of sugar and banana blossoms (or pineapples) to make it sweeter and water to keep the meat moist and to yield a rich sauce.

Paksiw na dilis
A unique variant of fish paksiw made with anchovies (known as dilis in Tagalog and bolinaw in Visayan languages) that is then wrapped in a banana leaf. It is also known as inun-unan na bolinaw or pinais na bolinaw in Visayan-speaking regions.

Paksiw na isda
Paksiw na isda is fish poached in a vinegar broth usually seasoned with fish sauce and spiced with siling mahaba. It also usually includes vegetables, commonly ampalaya (bitter melon).

Paksiw na lechon
Paksiw na lechon, which is left-over spit-roasted pork (lechon) meat cooked in vinegar, garlic, onions, and black pepper and some water. The Luzon version adds ground liver or liver spread ("lechon sauce"), while the Visayan versions do not.

See also
Linarang
Dinuguan
Cuisine of the Philippines
Philippine adobo, another Philippine cooking method that uses vinegar

References

Philippine cuisine